Striking on April 13, 1995, the 1995 Marathon earthquake was recorded at moment magnitude of 5.7. It rattled buildings near the epicenter.

Geography 
The earthquake struck western Texas with magnitude 5.7 force. It was the 3rd largest earthquake in the United States in 1995. The epicenter was probably in Alpine.

Damage and casualties 
Not a particularly damaging earthquake, the event caused two direct injuries. Both were slight.

See also
 List of earthquakes in 1995
 List of earthquakes in the United States
 List of earthquakes in Texas

References

External links

1995 earthquakes
1995 in Texas
1995
April 1995 events in the United States
Brewster County, Texas